One Night in Indy is a live album released in 2016 by Resonance Records that features Wes Montgomery and the Eddie Higgins Trio and comprises recordings made in 1959. The album was a promotion for Record Store Day and has received positive reviews.

Reception
Stephen Thomas Erlewine of AllMusic gave the album 3.5 out of five stars, citing the exciting tempo and the "mellow yet lively interplay" between musicians as strengths while criticizing the quality of the audio. Writing for JazzTimes, Colin Fleming praised Montgomery's virtuosity and Higgins' piano work. In PopMatters, John Paul awarded the recording 7/10, agreeing that the stars are Higgins and Montgomery, summing up, "Hearing these two giants together, while not quite at the level of Coltrane and Monk, is nonetheless a thrillingly enjoyable spectacle."

Track listing
"Give Me the Simple Life" (Rube Bloom and Harry Ruby) – 9:15
"Prelude to a Kiss" (Duke Ellington, Irving Gordon, and Irving Mills) – 5:52
"Stompin' at the Savoy" (Benny Goodman, Edgar Sampson, and Chick Webb) – 7:12
"Li'l Darling" (Neal Hefti) – 8:09
"Ruby, My Dear" (Thelonious Monk) – 8:34
"You'd Be Nice to Come Home To" (Cole Porter) – 2:51

Personnel
Wes Montgomery – bandleader, guitar
Eddie Higgins – piano
Walter Perkins – drums
unknown musician – double bass

Technical personnel
Zev Feldman – liner notes, production
Fran Gala – mixing, restoration
Bernie Grundman – mastering
George Klabin – executive production, mixing, restoration
Robert Montgomery – associate production
Sydney B. Lanex – production assistance
Duncan Schiedt – engineering
Burton Yount – art direction, design

See also

References

External links

2016 live albums
Live hard bop albums
Resonance Records live albums
Wes Montgomery albums
Record Store Day releases